Parliamentary elections were held in Moldova on 22 March 1998. The Party of Communists of the Republic of Moldova (PCRM) emerged as the largest party in Parliament, winning 40 of the 101 seats. However, the three other parties to win seats – the Democratic Convention of Moldova (26 seats), For a Democratic and Prosperous Moldova (24), and the Party of Democratic Forces (11) – formed a coalition government which was later known as the Alliance for Democracy and Reforms, pushing the Communists in opposition until the next elections in 2001.

Results

References

1998 elections in Moldova
Moldova
1998 in Moldova
Parliamentary elections in Moldova